Jorge Barlin (April 23, 1850 – September 4, 1909) also known as Jorge Barlin Imperial, Jorge Alfonso Imperial Barlin and Jorge Barlin e Imperial following Spanish naming customs, was the first Filipino consecrated a bishop in the Roman Catholic Church. He served as bishop of the Roman Catholic Archdiocese of Caceres (then called Diocese of Nueva Caceres) in the Philippines until 1909. He was the first Filipino and Bicolano bishop and was parish priest and vicar forane of Sorsogon from 1887 to 1906.

Life

Jorge Barlin was born April 23, 1850 in Baao, Camarines Sur, the Philippines to Mateo Alfonso Barlin and Francisca Imperial.

He was ordained a priest on September 19, 1875 and consecrated a bishop on June 29, 1906, by Archbishop Ambrose Agius along with co-consecrators Archbishop Jeremiah James Harty and Bishop Frederick Zadok Rooker. "Barlin proved very capable and loyal, dealing a blow to the schismatic Iglesia Filipinia Independiente by resisting its recruitment efforts and winning a court battle over church property," according to Catholic Bishops Conference of the Philippines.

He died and was interred in Rome, Italy in 1909 during an ad limina visit of the Philippine bishops. Attempts to have his body returned to the Philippines were unsuccessful.

Monuments commemorating Jorge Barlin were built in his hometown's plaza in Baao, Camarines Sur, and another called Plaza Barlin in Naga, Camarines Sur.

See also
Catholic Church in the Philippines

References

Further reading
 Alarcon, R.A. (2009). The Episcopal Consecration of Bishop Jorge Barlin: A New Phase in Philippine Church History. Philippiniana Sacra XLIV(131).

1850 births
1909 deaths
People from Camarines Sur
20th-century Roman Catholic archbishops in the Philippines
People from Baao, Camarines Sur
Roman Catholic bishops of Cáceres